There are more than 250,000 living Oklahoma State University alumni worldwide.  Oklahoma State alumni include billionaire T. Boone Pickens, country music recording artist Garth Brooks, computer pioneer Dr. H. Edward Roberts, astronaut Wally Funk and South Korea Prime Minister Nam Duck-woo. Faculty and staff who are not alumni have also distinguished themselves and are included in this list.

Alumni

Academia
* Some OSU alumni who have distinguished themselves in academia are included under other headings.
 * George S. Benson, missionary, college administrator, conservative political activist and segregationist

 Anita Hill, Government, Brandeis University
 Ramchandran Jaikumar, Daewoo Professor of Business Administration at the Harvard Business School
 Linda Livingstone, President of Baylor University
 Sidney A. McPhee, President of Middle Tennessee State University
 Gene R. Nichol, former President of The College of William and Mary
 J. Tinsley Oden, pioneer in the field of computational mechanics, one of the most highly cited researchers in the world
 David Noel Ramírez Padilla, Rector, Monterrey Institute of Technology and Higher Education
 John R. Rice, mathematician and computer scientist; founder of ACM Transactions on Mathematical Software; Professor at Purdue University
 Steven A. Scott, ninth president of Pittsburg State University.

Arts, letters media and entertainment
 Keith Anderson, country music singer, songwriter
 John Ashley, producer (The A-Team, Walker, Texas Ranger); associate producer (Apocalypse Now: Redux)
 Tomur Atagok, Turkish artist
 Hoyt Axton, noted rock and folk singer-songwriter and actor
 K. K. Barrett, production designer
 Jason Boland, country music singer, songwriter
 Garth Brooks, singer, songwriter and actor (the best-selling solo album artist in the United States and one of the best-selling artists of all time worldwide)
 June Burn, pioneering magazine writer and author
 Gary Busey, actor
 Jaime Cardriche, actor (Malcolm & Eddie)
 Ally Carter, born Sarah Fogleman, NY Times and USA Today bestselling author
 Sarah Coburn, operatic soprano; daughter of senator Tom Coburn, also an OSU alumni
 Jay Daniel, television producer
 Burr DeBenning, film, television and stage actor
 Ty England, country music singer
 Dave Garrett, New Orleans Saints and Dallas Cowboys radio broadcaster
 Doug Gottlieb, ESPN analyst and syndicated sports talk radio host
 Chester Gould, creator of the Dick Tracy comic strip
 Aaron Gwyn, American short story author and literary critic
 Regina Holliday, artist, medical rights advocate
 Helen Holmes, journalist, historian, and Women's Army Corps officer
Brandon Jenkins, singer-songwriter from Tulsa, Oklahoma; sang in the choir; taught himself guitar
 Siddika Kabir, Bangladeshi cooking show host and cookbook author
 Trey Kennedy, comedian, actor, singer
 Joe King, country music singer-songwriter, and former NFL player, wrote and recorded Down In Stillwater Oklahoma
 Ted Leitner, San Diego Padres radio broadcaster
 Rex Linn, actor (best known as Frank Tripp in the television series CSI: Miami)
 James Marsden, actor and model (attained global stardom with X-Men film series)
 A. Frank Martin, musician, educator, and founding member of Kappa Kappa Psi
 Sharron Miller, television producer, director, writer (first woman ever to win the coveted Directors Guild of America Award)
 Pamela Morsi, USA Today bestselling author
 Kinga Philipps, actor, television host
 Steve Ripley, country-rock artist and guitarist
 Lise Simms, television actress and designer
 Larry Thompson, humor columnist, author
 Watermelon Slim, born Bill Homans, blues artist
 Emily Wickersham, NCIS, Sopranos, actress

Business

 Minnie Lou Bradley, Class of 1953, first woman to graduate from OSU with a degree in animal husbandry; matriarch of Bradley 3 Ranch in Childress County, Texas
 Gordon Eubanks, CEO and President of Symantec Corporation, makers of Norton AntiVirus
 John D. Groendyke, CEO of Groendyke Transport
 Clark Hallren, managing director of Clear Scope Partners, financial and strategic advisor for those in the media and entertainment industry; former managing director of the Entertainment Industries Group of JPMorgan Securities, Inc.
 Paul Miller, former President of the Associated Press; former chairman and CEO of Gannett Company (publisher of many newspapers including USA Today, Arizona Republic and the Indianapolis Star)
 Neal Patterson, CEO of Cerner Corporation
 T. Boone Pickens, corporate tycoon; has donated over $235 million to OSU, including the renovation of the football stadium
 William A. Scroggs, insurance agent; founder of Kappa Kappa Psi
 M. B. "Bud" Seretean, former CEO of Coronet Industries, former general manager of the Atlanta Hawks
 Sanjiv Sidhu, founder of software giants i2 Technologies, the disruptive first mover in supply-chain-management software, and o9 Solutions
 Charles Watson, Chairman, founder and CEO of energy giant Dynegy Corp.; owner of the Houston Aeros professional hockey team
 Jerry Winchester, President and CEO of Boots & Coots International Well Control Inc.; CEO of Chesapeake Oilfield Services

Public Affairs

 Yussur A.F. Abrar, Governor of the Central Bank of Somalia
 Joe Allbaugh, former FEMA director (February 2001 to March 2003)
 Adnan Badran, former Prime Minister of Jordan (also see academia section)
 Henry Bellmon, former US Senator (R-OK) and first Republican Governor of Oklahoma
 Francis Cherry, former Governor of Arkansas
 Tom Coburn, US Senator (R-OK)
 John W. Doucette, Brig. General, US Air Force
 Nam Duck-woo, former Prime Minister of South Korea
 Mary Fallin, former Governor of Oklahoma
 Walter E. Fountain, United States Army Brigadier General, Assistant Adjutant General of the Oklahoma Army National Guard, acting Deputy Director of the Army National Guard
 John Paul Hammerschmidt, former US Congressman, Arkansas
 Ali Hamsa, former Chief Secretary to the Government of Malaysia
 Alan J. Hawkins, Anglican bishop and COO of the Anglican Church in North America
 Joel Hefley, US House, 5th District of Colorado
 Anita Hill, American lawyer, professor and commentator
 Hossein Kazempour Ardebili, Iranian diplomat and OPEC representative
 Roger A. Lalich, U.S. National Guard general
 Frank Lucas, US House, 3rd District of Oklahoma
 Sidney Marks, Major General United States Army, All-American wrestler
 Clem McSpadden, US House, Oklahoma
 Don Nickles, former US Senator
 William B. Oden, American Methodist Bishop
 Abdisalam Omer, former Governor of the Central Bank of Somalia
 Robert Dale Price, US House, Texas Panhandle
 Jim Reese, former member of the Oklahoma House of Representatives and commissioner of the Oklahoma Department of Agriculture
 Virgil A. Richard, Brig. General, US Army
 William Royer, former US Congressman, California
 Ray L. Smith, Major General, retired United States Marine Corps; inductee of the Oklahoma Military Hall of Fame
 Kevin Stitt, Current Governor of Oklahoma
 Steven W. Taylor, Oklahoma Supreme Court Justice
 Richard A. Waterfield, late State Representative from Canadian, Texas
 Wes Watkins, former US House Representative, Oklahoma
 Robert A. Whitney, Acting Surgeon General of the United States

Science, technology and engineering

 Walter Clore, pioneer in Washington State wine growing; the "father of Washington wine"
 Wally Funk First female FAA and NTSB inspector; one of the Mercury 13; oldest woman in space as of July 2021 
 Katherine O. Musgrave (1920–2015), Professor Emerita of food and nutrition, University of Maine
 William Pogue, Ret. Colonel, USAF, NASA astronaut, pilot of Skylab 4
 John R. Rice, mathematician and computer scientist; founder of ACM Transactions on Mathematical Software; Professor at Purdue University
 Dr. H. Edward Roberts, engineer and inventor of the personal computer
 Stuart Roosa, NASA astronaut, Apollo 14
 Donald Sechrest (1956), golf course designer
 Robert A. Whitney, Acting Surgeon General of the United States

For more Oklahoma State University graduates of distinction in the sciences, see the "Academia" section.

Sports

 Jerry Adair, former MLB player and coach
 Adnan Al-Kaissie, former pro wrestler and manager
 Tony Allen, former NBA basketball player, New Orleans Pelicans
 Dan Bailey, current NFL football player, Free Agent
 Harold Bailey, NFL and CFL player
 Scott Baker, former MLB pitcher, Minnesota Twins
 Tatum Bell, former NFL football player
 Bo Bowling, Montreal Alouettes player
 Jordan Brailford, NFL outside linebacker, Washington Redskins
 Jack Brisco, former pro wrestler, two-time former NWA World Heavyweight Champion
 Jerry Brisco, former pro wrestler
Markel Brown (born 1992), basketball player in the Israeli Basketball Premier League
 Rod Brown, All-American football player
 Dez Bryant, former NFL wide receiver for the Dallas Cowboys
 Jeromy Burnitz, former MLB baseball player
 Keith Burns, former NFL football player, Denver Broncos
Michael Cobbins (born 1992), basketball player for Maccabi Haifa of the Israeli Basketball Premier League
Carrie-Lynn Cohen (born 1967), Canadian tennis player
 Kelly Cook, former NFL football player, Green Bay Packers
 Daniel Cormier, Olympic wrestler, NCAA runner-up, mixed martial artist, current UFC Light Heavyweight & Heavyweight Champion
 Randy Couture, three-time All-American wrestler; Former UFC Heavyweight and Light Heavyweight Champion, and UFC Hall of Fame member
 Mason Cox, current Australian rules football player with Collingwood of the Australian Football League
 Kendall Cross, three-time All-American wrestler and won the NCAA National Championship in 1989, gold medalist in wrestling at 57 kg in 1996
 Pete Darcey, former NBA basketball player
 Gary Darnell, former college football coach
 Alex Dieringer, three-time NCAA Champion wrestler
 Marcus Dove, basketball player
 Shane Drury, rodeo bull-rider who died prematurely from cancer
 Danny Edwards, PGA Tour golfer
 David Edwards, PGA Tour golfer
 John Farrell, manager of 2013 World Series champion Boston Red Sox
 Josh Fields, former MLB baseball player, Royals
 Rickie Fowler, professional golfer
 Don Frye, wrestled during OSU NCAA Championship in 1989, former mixed martial artist in Pride Fighting Championships and the UFC
 Edward C. Gallagher, champion sprinter and football player, former wrestling coach; winningest coach in NCAA wrestling history, Olympic wrestling coach, National Wrestling Hall of Fame charter member
 Reuben Gant, former NFL football player, Buffalo Bills
 Walt Garrison, former Pro Bowl NFL football player, Dallas Cowboys
 Vickie Gates, IFBB professional bodybuilder
 Jason Gildon, former Pro Bowl NFL football player, Pittsburgh Steelers
 Chad Glasgow, former defensive coordinator for the Texas Tech Red Raiders football team
 Derrel Gofourth, former NFL football player, Green Bay Packers
 Joey Graham, former NBA basketball player, Toronto Raptors
 Mike Gundy, current head coach of Oklahoma State University football
 Brent Guy, college football coach
 Charlie Harper, former NFL football player, New York Giants
 Bob Harris, former NBA player
 Labron Harris, first golf coach at Oklahoma State University
 Don Haskins, former NCAA men's basketball coach, University of Texas at El Paso, subject of the movie Glory Road
 Mark Hayes, PGA Tour, Senior PGA Tour golfer
 Randy Heckenkemper, golf course architect
 Johny Hendricks, retired professional mixed martial artist; former UFC Welterweight Champion; two-time NCAA Wrestling Champion (2005, 2006)
Anthony Hickey (born 1992), basketball player for Hapoel Haifa in the Israeli Basketball Premier League
 Rusty Hilger, former NFL football player, Detroit Lions
 Morgan Hoffmann, professional golfer
 Mike Holder, former men's golf coach and current athletic director
 Joe Horlen, former MLB All-Star pitcher
 Viktor Hovland, current PGA Tour golfer
 Charles Howell III, current PGA Tour golfer
 Dick Hutton, former pro wrestler, former NWA World Heavyweight Champion
Henry Iba, NCAA and Olympic champion basketball coach, National Basketball Hall of Fame member
 Moe Iba, former University of Nebraska basketball coach
 Pete Incaviglia, former MLB baseball player, Baseball America and Collegiate Baseball newspaper College Baseball Player of the Century
 Ed Jeffers, former professional football player
 Charlie Johnson, current NFL player, Super Bowl Champion 2006 Indianapolis Colts
 John Juanda, professional poker player, winner of 5 World Series of Poker bracelets
 Howard N. "Sonny" Keys, NFL football player, Philadelphia Eagles 1960 World Champions (precursor to Super Bowl); coach of Cleveland Browns
 Joe King, former NFL player, current country music singer-songwriter, Cincinnati Bengals, Cleveland Browns, Tampa Bay Buccaneers, Las Vegas Raiders
 Jon Kolb (offensive tackle) 4 time Super Bowl Champion, NFL Hall of Fame
 Bob Kurland, basketball, two-time NCAA Champion, two-time Olympic Champion, Hall of Fame
 Jacob Lacey, current NFL football player, Indianapolis Colts
 Muhammed Lawal, MMA fighter
 Sonny Liles, football player
 John Little, former NFL football player, New York Jets
 Edward Loar, professional golfer
 John Lucas, current NBA basketball player, Houston Rockets
 Hunter Mahan, PGA Tour golfer
 Dexter Manley, former Pro Bowl NFL football player, Washington Redskins
 Desmond Mason, former NBA basketball player, Oklahoma City Thunder
 Caroline Masson, professional golfer
 Aaron McConnell, football player
 Leroy McGuirk, former pro wrestler and promoter; three-time NWA World Light Heavyweight Champion
 R. W. McQuarters, former NFL football player, New York Giants
 Bud Millikan, basketball coach of University of Maryland
 Steve Mocco, 2005 NCAA Division I Champion at Heavyweight; 2008 Olympic team member; current professional MMA fighter
 Kenny Monday, 3-time Olympic wrestler – 1988 welterweight gold medalist and 1992 welterweight silver medalist; 2x NCAA champion
 Vernand Morency, current NFL football player, Green Bay Packers
 Mark Muñoz, retired professional mixed martial artist, UFC middleweight, two-time wrestling All-American, NCAA Champion in 2001
 Ray Murphy, Jr., former wrestler; developer of handicapped-assisting technologies; recipient of Medal of Courage from the National Wrestling Hall of Fame
Le'Bryan Nash (born 1992), basketball player in the Israeli Basketball Premier League
 Alexander Norén, professional golfer
 Houston Nutt, current NCAA football head coach, University of Mississippi
 Leslie O'Neal, former Pro Bowl NFL football player, San Diego Chargers
 Bill Owen, former NFL football player, New York Giants
 Frank Parker, former NFL football player, Cleveland Browns
 Juqua Parker, former NFL football player, Philadelphia Eagles
 Jim Parmer, former NFL football player, Philadelphia Eagles
 Doyle Parrack, former NBA basketball player, and NCAA coach
 Danny Perez, former MLB outfielder, Milwaukee Brewers
 Kevin Peterson, American football player
 Lenzy Pipkins, American football player
 Dean Prater, former NFL football player, Buffalo Bills
 Bryant Reeves, former NBA basketball player, Vancouver Grizzlies
 Allie Reynolds, MLB pitcher
 Shane Roller, three-time All-American wrestler; retired MMA fighter
 Jake Rosholt, 3X NCAA champion wrestler, retired MMA fighter
 Jared Rosholt, former NCAA All-American wrestler; professional mixed martial artist with the PFL
 Rusty Ryal, current MLB infielder, Arizona Diamondbacks
 James David "Buddy" Ryan, former NFL defensive coordinator (see: 46 Defense/Chicago Bears) and Head Coach
 Barry Sanders, Heisman Trophy winner, former NFL football player, Detroit Lions; Hall of Famer
 Luke Scott, current MLB outfielder, Baltimore Orioles
 Dave Schultz (attended), 3x NCAA Champion, Olympic and world champion wrestler
 Bill Self, current NCAA basketball head coach, University of Kansas; former head coach Oral Roberts University, University of Tulsa, University of Illinois
 Jerry Sherk, former Pro Bowl NFL football player, Cleveland Browns
 Jerry Slack, golf course architect
 Marcus Smart, current NBA player for the Boston Celtics, 6th overall draft pick in 2014
 Antonio Smith, former Pro Bowl NFL football player, Houston Texans
 John Smith, current head coach of Oklahoma State University wrestling, 2X NCAA champion, 4X World and 2X Olympic gold medal winner, National Wrestling Hall of Fame member
 Pat Smith, first four-time NCAA D1 Champion wrestler
 John Starks, former Oklahoma State basketball player, former New York Knicks guard
 Eddie Sutton, former men's basketball head coach at several schools, among them Oklahoma State
 Scott Sutton, former head coach of Oral Roberts University basketball
 Sean Sutton, former head coach of Oklahoma State University basketball
 Lane Taylor, current NFL player, Green Bay Packers
 Mickey Tettleton, former MLB baseball player
 Doug Tewell, PGA Tour, Senior PGA Tour golfer
 Thurman Thomas, former NFL football player, Buffalo Bills; Hall of Famer
 Leonard Thompson, former NFL football player, Detroit Lions
 Jim Turner, NFL player
 Orville Tuttle, former Pro Bowl NFL football player, New York Giants
 Bob Tway, current PGA Tour golfer
 Peter Uihlein, professional golfer
 Robert (Bo) Van Pelt, professional golfer
 Robin Ventura, former MLB baseball player
 Scott Verplank, current PGA Tour golfer
 Donnie Walton, current MLB infielder, Seattle Mariners
 Gary Ward, former baseball coach
 John Ward, former NFL football player, Minnesota Vikings
 John Washington, former NFL football player, New York Giants
 Brian Watts, former PGA TOUR player
 John Ray Webster, checkers champion
 Brandon Weeden, current NFL football player, Dallas Cowboys
 Reggie White, former NFL player
 Darrell Williams (born 1989), basketball player for Hapoel Tel Aviv of the Israeli Premier League
 Darrent Williams, former NFL football player, Denver Broncos (d. 2007)
 Jamal Williams, former Pro Bowl NFL football player, San Diego Chargers
 Kevin Williams, current Pro Bowl NFL football player, Minnesota Vikings
 Casey Wittenberg, current PGA Tour Golfer
 Duane Wood, former AFL All-Star football player, Kansas City Chiefs
 Rashaun Woods, former NFL football player, San Francisco 49ers
 Kenyatta Wright, former NFL football player, New York Jets
 Toby Wynn (2001), head women's basketball coach for Emporia State University

Faculty and administration

Presidents past and present

Notable former and current faculty
 Girish Saran Agarwal, physicist
 Ai, poet; member of OSU English faculty until her death
 Hilton Briggs, President of South Dakota State University
 Elliott D. Canonge, linguist specializing in Native American cultures
 Robert P. Celarier, leading botanist and agrostologist
 Alfred Corn, poet
 Angie Debo, leading historian of Oklahoma and Native Americans; curator of maps for Oklahoma A&M library, 1947–1955; left her papers to OSU Library
 J. Frank Dobie, author; folklorist; taught English at OSU; most remembered for his service at the University of Texas at Austin
 Brian Evenson, academic and writer of both literary fiction and popular fiction
 Wolt Fabrycky, industrial engineering scholar
 Bryan P. Glass, mammalogist
 Elbert Glover, public health expert
 Edward Goljan, medical educator
 Toni Graham, American fiction writer
 Jack Harlan, agronomist
 Riffat Hassan, Pakistani-American religious scholar notable for her studies of Islamic feminism
Helen Holmes, journalist, historian, and Women's Army Corps officer
 William Jaco, mathematician; discovered the JSJ decomposition
 George Judge, economist
 Subhash Kak, computer scientist and public intellectual
 Sheldon Katz, mathematician and string theorist (now at the University of Illinois)
 Nicholas A. Kotov, noted chemical engineering professor (now professor at University of Michigan)
 Edmon Low, pioneering university librarian
 Bohumil Makovsky, director of bands; "the Guiding Spirit of Kappa Kappa Psi"
 Robert W. MacVicar, former President of Oregon State University
 J. Tinsley Oden, pioneering scholar of engineering (now at University of Texas)
 Aimee Parkison, short story writer and novelist
 Christine Salmon, American architect
 Mike Sowell, journalist and sportswriter
 Robert Sternberg, one of the twenty most-cited psychologists of the 20th century
 N.V.V.J. Swamy, mathematical physicist
 Paul J. Tikalsky, American civil engineer
 Elsayed Elsayed Wagih, inventor of the zymoblot
 Joseph W. Westphal, political scientist, educator, and former United States Under Secretary of the Army

Former and current athletic staff

 Larry Coker, former coach of University of Miami
 Butch Davis, former coach of University of Miami and Cleveland Browns
 Rickie Fowler, current player in the PGA          
Edward C. Gallagher, former wrestling and track and field coach, physical education professor and athletic director
 Leonard Hamilton, current coach of Florida State Seminoles basketball
 Henry Iba, former basketball coach and athletic director
 Jimmy Johnson, current Fox sports analyst; former coach of Dallas Cowboys and Miami Dolphins; spokesman for Extenze
 Les Miles, current head football coach of LSU
 Doyle Parrack, won national basketball championship under Henry Iba in 1945; assistant coach under Iba; head women's basketball coach, 1978–80
 Oail Andrew "Bum" Phillips, NFL Head Coach of Houston Oilers; assistant coach under Jim Stanley
 Eddie Sutton, former basketball coach (also alumnus)
 Dave Wannstedt, current coach of Pittsburgh Panthers; former coach of Chicago Bears and Miami Dolphins

See also
 List of Oklahoma State University Olympians

References

External links
 Oklahoma State University Alumni Association

Oklahoma State University people
Oklahoma State University